An epode is the third part of an ode that follows the strophe and the antistrophe and completes the movement.

Evolution
At a certain point in time the choirs, which had previously chanted to right of the altar or stage, and then to left of it, combined and sang in unison, or permitted the coryphaeus to sing for them all, while standing in the centre. With the appearance of Stesichorus and the evolution of choral lyric, a learned and artificial kind of poetry began to be cultivated in Greece, and a new form, the epode-song, came into existence. It consisted of a verse of iambic trimeter, followed by a verse of iambic dimeter, and it is reported that, although the epode was carried to its highest perfection by Stesichorus, an earlier poet, Archilochus, was really the inventor of this form.

The epode soon took its place in choral poetry, which it lost when that branch of literature declined. But it extended beyond the ode, and in the early dramatists we find numerous examples of monologues and dialogues framed on the epodical system. In Latin poetry the epode was cultivated, in conscious archaism, both as a part of the ode and as an independent branch of poetry. Of the former class, the epithalamia of Catullus, founded on an imitation of Pindar, present us with examples of strophe, antistrophe and epode; and it has been observed that the celebrated ode of Horace, beginning Quem virum aut heroa lyra vel acri, possesses this triple character.

Epodes of Horace

The word is now mainly familiar from an experiment of Horace in the second class, for he titled his fifth book of odes Epodon liber or the Book of Epodes. He says in the course of these poems that in composing them he was introducing a new form, at least in Latin literature, and that he was imitating the effect of the iambic distichs invented by Archilochus. Accordingly, the first ten of these epodes are composed in alternate verses of iambic trimeter and iambic dimeter, as at, for example, Epode 5.1–2:

In the seven remaining epodes Horace diversified the measures, while retaining the general character of the distich. This group of poems belongs mostly to the early youth of the poet and displays a truculence and a controversial heat which are absent from his more mature writings. As he was imitating Archilochus in form, he believed himself justified in repeating the sarcastic violence of his fierce model. These particular poems of Horace, which are short lyrical satires, have appropriated almost exclusively the name of epodes, although they bear little enough resemblance to the epode of early Greek literature.

See also
 Prosody (Latin)

Notes

External links

Ancient Greek theatre
Poetic forms